Bill Connelly may refer to:

Bill Connelly (baseball) (1925–1980), American baseball player
Bill Connelly (soccer), American soccer player
William A. Connelly (born 1931), sixth Sergeant Major of the Army

See also
William Connolly (disambiguation)
William Connolley (born 1964), software engineer, climatology blogger and Wikipedia editor